Altrivalvina is a genus of moths in the family Geometridae. Its only species, Altrivalvina magnifica, was described from Yunnan, China. Both the genus and species were described by Wehrli in 1939.

References

Ennominae
Geometridae genera
Monotypic moth genera